Yu Chunyan (born April 18, 1985 in Jiaxing, Zhejiang) is a female Chinese sports sailor who competed for China at the 2008 Summer Olympics. Her height is 176 cm and her weight is 67 kg.

Major performances
2006 Asian Championships - 1st 470 class;
2006 National Championships Qingdao - 1st 470 class/470 class long distance race;
2006 National Championships Grand Finals Rizhao - 1st 470 class

References

1985 births
Living people
Chinese female sailors (sport)
Olympic sailors of China
Sportspeople from Jiaxing
Sailors at the 2008 Summer Olympics – 470
Asian Games medalists in sailing
Sailors at the 2006 Asian Games
Medalists at the 2006 Asian Games
Asian Games bronze medalists for China
21st-century Chinese women